These are the Billboard Hot 100 number-one singles of 1980. The two longest running number-one singles of 1980 are "Call Me" by Blondie and "Lady" by Kenny Rogers with each single obtaining six weeks on top of the chart. Every song that went to number one for 1980 stayed on the Billboard Hot 100 over twenty weeks.

That year, six acts hit number one for the first time, such as Queen, Pink Floyd, Lipps Inc., Billy Joel, Christopher Cross, and Kenny Rogers. John Lennon was the fourth artist to hit number one posthumously, after his death in December 1980.

The British rock band Queen was the only act to achieve multiple number-one songs during the year with “Crazy Little Thing Called Love” and “Another One Bites the Dust”.

Chart history

Number-one artists

See also
1980 in music
Cashbox Top 100 number-one singles of 1980
List of Billboard number-one singles

References

Additional sources
Fred Bronson's Billboard Book of Number 1 Hits, 5th Edition
Joel Whitburn's Top Pop Singles 1955-2008, 12 Edition
Joel Whitburn Presents the Billboard Hot 100 Charts: The Eighties
Additional information obtained can be verified within Billboard's online archive services and print editions of the magazine.

1980 record charts
1980